Bryan Berroya Bagunas (born October 10, 1997) is a Filipino volleyball player who plays for Taiwanese club Win Streak and the Philippine national team.

Early life
Bryan Bagunas was born on October 10, 1997 in Batangas City. Prior to his college education, he was more into basketball than volleyball. Bagunas started playing volleyball in his second year of high school education and participated in both basketball and volleyball events in his school's intramurals. He also participated in various municipal and national volleyball tournaments prior into being scouted for the National University.

Career

Collegiate
Bagunas played for the men's volleyball team of the National University (NU) at the University Athletic Association of the Philippines (UAAP). He helped NU win the UAAP Seasons 80 and 81 men's volleyball titles and was also named the Finals MVP for both seasons. He was also a three-time Best Server (from UAAP Season 79 to 81) and the UAAP Attacker and Season MVP for Season 81.

Bagunas also represented NU at the 2018 Premier Volleyball League Collegiate Conference, where he aided the team's title win over the University of Santo Tomas and was also named as the 1st Best Outside Spiker and Finals MVP.

Club

Sta Elena and Philippine Air Force
In the club level, Bagunas played for Sta. Elena at the 2018 Premier Volleyball League Open Conference where Bagunas was named the 2nd Best Outside Spiker and Conference MVP. He also played for the Go for Gold-Philippine Air Force Jet Spikers of the Spikers' Turf.

Oita Miyoshi Weisse Adler
In mid-2019, Bagunas announced that he has signed to play for Japanese club, Oita Miyoshi Weisse Adler of V.League 1. His first match with the club was against the JT Thunders. According to Bagunas, training with the Japanese club leaned towards technique compared to training with Philippine-based teams which he described focus on physicality particularly on managing one's power in executing hits. He left Oita Miyoshi in June 2022.

Win Streak
He would join Taiwanese club Win Streak in August 2022 to play for them at the Datuk Bandar Cup Win+ Streak Invitational Championship in Malaysia  and later the Top Volleyball League in Taiwan.

Imus City
In February 2023, Bagunas signs up with the Imus City–AJAA Spikers and is set to join the team's campaign in the 2023 Spikers' Turf Open Conference in March 2023 following the conclusion of his stint with Win Streak.

National team
Bagunas was part of the Philippine men's national team that represented the country at the Southeast Asian Games; in the 2017 and 2019 Southeast Asian Games.

Bagunas's first participation in the Southeast Asian Games was in the 2017 edition where the Philippine national team failed to clinch a podium finish. Likewise in the 2019 Southeast Asian Games, there was some issue in the preparations with Bagunas having limited time to train with his national team teammates since he simultaneously had to fulfill his obligations to participate in a training camp with his Japanese club, Oita Miyoshi. Despite this, the national team was able to secure a finals appearance in 42 years and clinch a silver medal finish after losing to Indonesia in the final.

NU represented the Philippines at the 2018 ASEAN University Games in Myanmar. Bagunas was part of that Philippine squad which won the men's volleyball title by beating Thailand's representatives in the gold medal match. This surpassed the Philippines' bronze medal finish in the 2016 edition held in Singapore.

Personal life
Bagunas is engaged with longtime girlfriend Nicole Tracy Tan since April 2022.

Clubs
  Go for Gold-Philippine Air Force Jet Spikers (2016–present)
  Sta. Elena–NU (2018)
  Oita Miyoshi Weisse Adler (2019–2022)
  Win Streak (2022–present)

Awards

Individual awards
 2016 Spikers' Turf 2nd Reinforced Open Conference "Most Valuable Player (Finals)"
 UAAP Season 79 “Best Server”
 UAAP Season 80 “Finals MVP”
 2018 Premier Volleyball League Reinforced Conference "Most Valuable Player (Finals)"
 2018 Premier Volleyball League 2nd Season Collegiate Conference "Most Valuable Player (Finals)"
 2018 Premier Volleyball League 2nd Season Collegiate Conference "1st Best Outside Spiker"
 2018 Spikers' Turf Open Conference "Season's Most Valuable Player"
 2018 Spikers' Turf Open Conference "2nd Best Outside Spiker"
 UAAP Season 81 “Season's MVP”
 UAAP Season 81 “Finals MVP”
 UAAP Season 81 “1st Best Outside Spiker”
 UAAP Season 81 “Best Server”
 2022-23 Enterprise Volleyball League "Best Outside Spiker"

References

Living people
Filipino men's volleyball players
Philippines international volleyball players
National University (Philippines) alumni
1997 births
Competitors at the 2019 Southeast Asian Games
Southeast Asian Games medalists in volleyball
Southeast Asian Games silver medalists for the Philippines
University Athletic Association of the Philippines volleyball players
People from Batangas City
Filipino expatriate volleyball players
Outside hitters
Filipino expatriate sportspeople in Japan
Competitors at the 2021 Southeast Asian Games